Let Yourself Be Loved is the fifth studio album by German soul singer Joy Denalane. It was released by Nesola, the label of Denalane and her husband Max Herre, in association with Vertigo Berlin and Motown Records on September 4, 2020.

It is the first album by a German artist to be released by Motown.

Track listing
All songs produced and arranged by Roberto Di Gioia.

Charts

Release history

References

External links
 JoyDenalane.com — official site

2020 albums
Joy Denalane albums